Hord is an unincorporated community in Clay County, Illinois, United States. Hord is located on U.S. Route 45 north of Louisville, in Blair Township.

References

Unincorporated communities in Clay County, Illinois
Unincorporated communities in Illinois